A socialite is a person from a wealthy and (possibly) aristocratic background, who is prominent in high society. A socialite generally spends a significant amount of time attending various fashionable social gatherings, instead of having traditional employment.

Word history

The word socialite is first attested in 1909 in a California newspaper. It was popularized by Time magazine in the 1920s.

United Kingdom
Historically, socialites in the United Kingdom were almost exclusively from the families of the aristocracy and landed gentry. Many socialites also had strong familial or personal relationships to the British royal family.

Between the 17th and early 19th centuries, society events in London and at country houses were the focus of socialite activity. Notable examples of British socialites include Beau Brummell, Lord Alvanley, the Marchioness of Londonderry, Daisy, Princess of Pless, Lady Diana Cooper, Mary Constance Wyndham, Lady Ursula d'Abo, Margaret Greville and the Mitford sisters. Since the 1960s, socialites have been drawn from a wider section of society more similar to the American model, with many socialites now coming from families in business or from the world of celebrity. Despite this, the notion of the Sloane ranger still emphasises many socialites' connections to Britain's ruling class. The Royal Borough of Kensington and Chelsea is widely regarded as the current home of socialite activity in the UK. The television show Made in Chelsea has explored the lifestyles of young socialites living in London in the 21st century.

United States
American members of the Establishment, or an American "society" based on birth, breeding, education, and economic standing, were originally listed in the Social Register, a directory of the names and addresses of the "preferred social contacts" of the prominent families in the 19th century. In 1886, Louis Keller started to consolidate these lists and package them for sale.

18th and 19th centuries
The concept of socialites dates to the 18th and 19th century. Most of the earliest socialites were wives or mistresses of royalty or nobility, but being a socialite was more a duty and a means of survival than a form of pleasure. Bashful queens were often forced to play gracious and wealthy hostess to people who despised them. Mistresses had to pay for their social reputation and had to use their social skills to obtain favor in the court and retain the interest of their lovers.

With the increase of wealth in the US in the 19th century, being a socialite developed into a role that brought power and influence.

21st century
In the 21st century, the term "socialite" is still attached to being wealthy and socially recognized. The lines between being a socialite and celebrity with an exuberant partying lifestyle have since become blurred due to the influence of both popular culture and the media, particularly when the status of being a celebrity is largely due to that lifestyle. Celebrity Paris Hilton  is an example of a 21st-century socialite due to her ability to attract media attention and fame based only on her connections and associations. Hilton is the great-granddaughter of Conrad Hilton, the founder of Hilton Hotels & Resorts, and heiress to the Hilton Hotel fortune. Due to her outrageous lifestyle, Hilton was hailed by the media as "New York's leading It Girl" in 2001.

Gossip Girl, an American television series airing between September 2007 and December 2012, focuses on the lives of New York City socialites who live on Manhattan's Upper East Side. The show is a strong influence on how socialites are regarded in the 21st century because of the presence of scandal, wealth, and fashion in each episode. Pop culture gives the impression that by simply being wealthy and fashionable, an individual has the opportunity to become famous. Consequently, it is an individual's ability to climb the social ladder due to his or her wealth and recognition that makes them a socialite.

According to The New York Times, socialites spend between $98,000 and $455,000 per year (young and old, respectively) to maintain their roles as successful socialites. Just the evening wardrobe of an individual regularly attending society functions can cost $100,000 annually. Examples of modern-day American socialites include:  Kim Kardashian, Jill Kelley, Tinsley Mortimer, EJ Johnson, Olivia Palermo, Lauren Santo Domingo, Paris Hilton, Derek Blasberg, and Jean Shafiroff.

Famous historical socialites

See also

 Conspicuous leisure
 Debutante
 Elitism
 Famous for being famous
 Ingroups and outgroups
 International Debutante Ball
 It girl
 Jet set
 List of American heiresses
 Sloane Ranger
 Social butterfly
 Social environment
 Social identity theory
 Southern belle
 Upper class
 White Anglo-Saxon Protestant
 Yuppie

References

17th-century introductions
Occupations

Sociological terminology